= Paper for All =

- Founded: 2005
- Founder: Emmanuel Cassimatis
- Type: Think tank, non-profit organization
- Purpose: Education
- Location: Paris, France
- Region served: Burkina Faso, Africa
- Key people: Emmanuel Cassimatis, Alfred Kadsondo
- Website: http://paper4all.org/

Paper for All or Paper4All is non-profit / charity organization registered in Burkina Faso, United Kingdom, France and the United States. Paper for All's main focus is to provide education and improve children's learning conditions, by supplying academic resources and tutoring, in one of the most illiterate countries in continental Africa, Burkina Faso, a country with a literacy rate of 24%, one of the lowest in the world.

== Projects ==
Paper for All is committed in facilitating the education of the neediest children by providing them with better education conditions.

=== Distribution of Education Supplies ===
Distribute school supplies to schools with greatest number of primary pupils.

Paper 4 All is now distributing supplies and among these five are:

1. L'Ecole de la Cité de l'Avenir (670 pupils)
2. L'Ecole Yakaa (150 pupils)
3. Trame d'Accueil A (880 pupils)
4. Trame d'Accueil B (500 pupils)

=== Tutoring Program ===
Paper4All has put in place a tutoring programme, called Burkina School Monitor. The beneficiaries received a scholarship to pay for their academic fees.

== Partners ==
Paper for All has worked and established partnerships or received support from a few select organizations.

1. The Herrod Foundation
2. The Iranian-Canadian Benevolent Foundation
3. Millennium Volunteers
4. ThinkSpotDesign
5. Junagarh Media
6. Clairefontaine - Rhodia
7. Air Liquide
8. Google Inc.
9. Deloitte & Touche
10. Community Services Volunteering
11. Lapdesk
12. Charity Car donation
13. Africa Guide
